Dreams Rewired (German title: Mobilisierung der Träume) is a 2015 Austrian/German/British feature documentary/essay film that reflects on the desires and anxieties provoked by contemporary information technologies, using archival footage from the late 19th and early 20th centuries. It is notable for including several previously unseen or newly restored films, including excerpts from the recently discovered version of Sergei Eisenstein's Battleship Potemkin with the original 1925 score by Edmund Meisel.

Description
Dreams Rewired is an assemblage of nearly 200 films, ranging from the 'pre-cinematic' experiments of Étienne-Jules Marey and the political cinema of Dziga Vertov, through to newsreels and early dramatic works by Alice Guy-Blaché. A voiceover text articulates the footage for contemporary contexts, drawing on the language of digital culture and social media. Eschewing a traditional; chronology of technological development, the film traces several trajectories through the electric information age, including that of the changing economic and cultural status of women. In her essay accompanying the DVD release, film theoretician Bodil Marie Stavning Thomsen describes it as an 'extended meditation on media, desire, and futurity [... that] transparently uses a double exposure of past (archive footage) and present (contemporary voiceover) to bring historical context to current dilemmas.' To give a material example, she notes that the film 'point[s] simultaneously back to the colonial expropriation of land, mineral wealth and labour (as material precondition for technological development), and to its continuation in, for example, contemporary mining (of coltan for electronic components in the Democratic Republic of Congo, say).' In a review reproduced in American Journalism, Patrick G. Wilz further remarks on the political content of the film, which concludes with 'marketers, politicians, and corporations [learning] to regulate and leverage communications technology to control the behavior of theiraudiences; appetites manufactured in order to be fed, visions of the future conjured in order to be sold.'

Cast
 Tilda Swinton as narrator

Release
The film premiered at the International Film Festival Rotterdam 2015 and had a limited theatrical release in the US and Europe.

Home media
The film is distributed on DVD by Icarus Films (North America) and absolutMEDIEN (Germany), and is available to stream via iTunes (USA and Canada) and Amazon.

Public collections
The Margaret Herrick Library at the Academy of Motion Picture Arts & Sciences holds a copy of the film transcript in its permanent Core Collection.

Music

The soundtrack by Austrian composer Siegfried Friedrich was nominated for Best Music at the Austrian Film Awards, and won the German Documentary Film Music Award.

Awards

4th German Documentary Film Music Award, Internationales Dokumentarfilmfestival München (DOK.fest) 2016.

Best Documentary Feature, Moscow International Documentary Film Festival 2016.

Papierene Gustl Award – Austrian Film Critics' Guild Award 2017.

Jury Award, Ann Arbor Film Festival 2015.

References

Further reading
Dreams Rewired. A Conversation with Manu Luksch and Mukul Patel by Martin Zeilinger. Found Footage, Issue #3, March 2017.
Dreams Rewired. Reviewed by Patrick G. Wilz. American Journalism 36:2, 2019.

External links

Dreams Rewired at Amazon Video
Dreams Rewired Film website
Dreams Rewired at the IFFR website 
Amour Fou Filmproduktion
Bildschön Filmproduktion
Ambient Information Systems

Documentary films about the Internet
Documentary films about television
Documentary films about radio
Documentary films about the media
Austrian documentary films
German documentary films
British documentary films
2015 documentary films
2015 films
2010s English-language films
2010s British films
2010s German films